Rahman Ahmadi (born 30 July 1980 in Noshahr, Iran) is an Iranian retired goalkeeper and coach.

Club career

Early career
Ahmadi started his career as a youth player at Shamoushak Noshahr in 1998. In 2000, he was promoted to the first team, he played four years for Shamoushak before being transferred to Saipa, where he won the league in 2007.

Sepahan
He moved to Sepahan in summer 2008 and was a regular player in his first season. In his second season with Sepahan, Ahmadi won the Iran Pro League although he only made four appearances throughout the season.

Saipa & Persepolis
In 2010 Ahmadi signed a contract with Tehran club Persepolis. He made 16 total appearances throughout the season. Disappointed with his playing time, Ahmadi returned to Sepahan in 2011. He made 38 appearances throughout the season as he led Sepahan to a Iran Pro League. He returned to Saipa in summer 2012 and made 33 appearances.

Return to Sepahan
He joined Sepahan for a third time in July 2013. He helped Sepahan attain a 4th-place finish in the 2013–14 Iran Pro League season, and was widely considered one of the best goalkeepers in the league with 15 clean sheets, only Nilson Corrêa Júnior was better.

Club career statistics
Last Update  1 July 2017

International career
In 2008, Ahmadi made his debut for Iran the final of West Asian Football Federation Championship against Jordan, with Team Melli going on to win the competition. After Mehdi Rahmati announced his temporary retirement in 2013, Ahmadi was made the number one goalkeeper of the Iranian team by Carlos Queiroz. Ahmadi was instrumental in helping Iran secure a place in the 2014 FIFA World Cup, as his double-save ensured a 1–0 Iran win over South Korea.

On 1 June 2014, he was called into Iran's 2014 FIFA World Cup squad by Carlos Queiroz. However, he did not made any appearance for the team, where Alireza Haghighi started all the games for Iran.

Honours
 Shamoushak
 Azadegan League (1): 2002-03

Saipa 
Iran Pro League (1): 2006–07

Sepahan
Iran Pro League (3): 2009–10, 2011–12, 2014–15

Persepolis
Hazfi Cup (1): 2010–11
 Iran
 West Asian Championship (1): 2008

References

External links

1980 births
Living people
Association football goalkeepers
Iranian footballers
Persian Gulf Pro League players
Saipa F.C. players
Shamoushak Noshahr players
Sepahan S.C. footballers
Persepolis F.C. players
Iran international footballers
2014 FIFA World Cup players
Sportspeople from Mazandaran province
People from Nowshahr